The Federation of Galaxy Explorers (FOGE) is a US youth group seeking to "...inspire and educate kids in space related science and engineering. Galaxy Explorers was created to prepare children for the future; a future that advances a space faring civilization."

Philosophy
FOGE operates using the following guiding principles for its members, called Guide Stars:
The future welcomes everybody
I will support the vision and mission of the Federation of Galaxy Explorers
I will be enthusiastic
I will work as a team member and support my fellow Galaxy Explorers
I will treat everyone with kindness, respect, and dignity
I will be honest
I will make opportunities, not wait for them to happen
I will do my best at everything I do
I will make the world a better place

School Year Program
Similar in some respects to Boy Scouts and Girl Scouts, FOGE sponsors monthly after-school (or evening) "Mission Team" meetings and periodic field trips, where adult volunteers teach space subjects and lead the participants in projects in space science, earth science, engineering and rocketry.

Another primary theme - Space Citizenship - teaches the role of government, the power of citizens in a democracy, the promise of space expressed in art, writing, history, and business. Mission Team members wear uniform shirts and are rewarded for participation and achievements with ribbons, patches, medals, and certificates. Awards are an integral part of the program providing children self-esteem through achievement and recognition.

Summer Program
Space-themed summer camps are held, offering younger participants the chance to design and build a simulated "moonbase". High-school aged participants have the opportunity to build and launch rockets with simulated satellites (instrument packages) that can reach altitudes of up to 2 miles, and are recovered by parachute while transmitting real-time telemetry data on position, attitude, temperature and other parameters.

Interactive Software
FOGE aims to support and teach children about space.  One method of doing so is through interactive video games, such as MoonBaseOne, which has had over 30,000 players.

History
FOGE began in 2002 with pilot programs in Colorado, Maryland, Washington, D.C. and Virginia. It has since expanded to Montana, Texas, California, and New Mexico, and supports over 15,000 participants.

Benefits
The Federation of Galaxy Explorers was incorporated in the state of Maryland as a 501(c)3 non profit organization. The organization seeks to inspire and educate kids in space related science and engineering. Galaxy Explorers was created to prepare children for the future; a future that advances a space faring civilization.  Objectives: 
 Educate kids - The Galaxy Explorers will prepare children for employment in the 21st century.
 Galvanize support for space - Over time, Galaxy Explorers kids will grow to create a long term citizen activist force in society; shaping the national space policy, and furthering the science and engineering required to create a space faring civilization.
 Economical - The concept of Galaxy Explorers is an extremely inexpensive means of educating the future generations by drawing on the volunteer spirit of America. The program provides a critical support infrastructure to motivate and educate children outside of the classroom. This infrastructure is particularly important given America's lack of classroom resources, science and math teachers, and modern day peer pressure.

The Way Forward
In 2002, Galaxy Explorers pilot programs began at pilot schools in Colorado, Maryland, Washington, D.C. and Virginia, where we conducted a summer space camp for 150 children. In less than five years we hosted 5000 children in 25 summer camps, after school, and evening programs. We hosted an additional 15,000 children in Special Events. We expanded the program to MT, TX, PA, MO, NJ, and NM. To accomplish this expansion, Galaxy Explorers has established partnerships with government agencies, businesses, and non-profit organizations. In addition, the effort is strongly supported by Congressional Members and staff.

See also 
 The Millennial Project

References

External links
 http://www.foge.org

Youth organizations based in the United States